David Howell (16 August 1831 – 15 January 1903) was the fourth Dean of St David's.

Life
Howell was the son of John Howell, farmer and Calvinistic Methodist deacon, of Treos, in the parish of Llangan, Glamorganshire. His mother being of weak health, he was brought up for the most part by his grandmother, Mary Griffiths of Tynycaeau, a church-woman. At the age of fifteen, he returned to his father's home, which was now at Bryn Cwtyn, near Pencoed. Farming, however, was not to his mind, and, having shown a decided bent for letters, he was persuaded by his mother and the rector of St. Mary Hill (afterwards well known as Archdeacon Griffiths of Neath) to prepare for orders in the Church of England. He studied at the Eagle School, Cowbridge, the Preparatory School, Merthyr, and the Llandaff Diocesan Institute at Abergavenny.

He was ordained in 1856 and began his career as Curate of Neath. After that he was Vicar of St John The Baptist, Cardiff 1865-75; Vicar of Wrexham 1875-1891; Vicar of Gresford 1891 - 1897 and Archdeacon of Wrexham 1890-1897  before his elevation to the Deanery.

Family
He married Anne Powell of Pencoed; they had four sons, one of whom was William Tudor Howell.

References

Attribution

1831 births
Welsh Anglicans
Archdeacons of Wrexham
Deans of St Davids
1903 deaths